Paco Ignacio Taibo may refer to either the father or the son:

Paco Ignacio Taibo I (1924–2008)
Paco Ignacio Taibo II (born 1949)